Sylvester Wallace Barnes (May 23, 1824October 24, 1862) was an American lawyer, engineer, and politician. He was a member of the Wisconsin Senate, representing Jefferson County during the 1856 and 1857 sessions. He died of disease due to service in the American Civil War.

Biography
S. W. Barnes was born in 1824, in the town of Turin, New York.  He moved to Wisconsin sometime before 1853, and settled in Watertown, in Jefferson County.  In Watertown, he was deeply involved in establishing the Watertown & Madison Railroad.

Barnes was elected to the Wisconsin Senate in 1855, running on the Democratic Party ticket.  He represented Jefferson County in the 1856 and 1857 sessions.  Barnes' political and financial interests intersected in the plan to extend the Watertown & Madison Railroad to the Mississippi River.  This ambitious plan was wrecked by the Panic of 1857, which led to the failure of the Watertown & Madison Railroad and Barnes' financial ruin.

Following his failures in Wisconsin, Barnes returned to New York.  He was at Troy, New York, at the outbreak of the American Civil War, and volunteered for service in the Union Army.  He was enrolled as first lieutenant of Company H in the 30th New York Infantry Regiment.  While serving with the regiment around Washington, D.C., in the early months of the war, he became severely ill.  He was sent back to his family in Utica, New York, where he died on October 24, 1862.

Sixty years after his death, the U.S. House of Representatives voted to upgrade him to an honorable discharge.

Personal life and family
Barnes was the son of Abraham A. and Lucinda (née Topping) Barnes.  The Barnes were descended from Thomas Barnes, a signatory of the New Haven Colony constitution of 1644.  His maternal ancestors traced their lineage back to Thomas Topping, who represented Wethersfield in the Connecticut General Court in the 1630s and was a signatory of the Hempstead Convention in 1665.

S. W. Barnes married Cornelia Augusta Chevalier.  They had one daughter.

References

1824 births
1862 deaths
People from Utica, New York
People from Jefferson County, Wisconsin
Democratic Party Wisconsin state senators
19th-century American politicians
Burials in New York (state)
Union Army officers
People of New York (state) in the American Civil War
People of Wisconsin in the American Civil War